Mark Murphy (born August 6, 1976) is an American former professional ice hockey forward who played over 400 games in the American Hockey League before spending the final six years of his career in Europe. He last played for German club, the DEG Metro Stars of the Deutsche Eishockey Liga (DEL), in the 2010–11 season. He was selected by the Toronto Maple Leafs in the 8th round (197th overall) of the 1995 NHL Entry Draft.

Career statistics

Regular season and playoffs

International

Awards and honours

References

External links

1976 births
Augsburger Panther players
DEG Metro Stars players
HC Fribourg-Gottéron players
HIFK (ice hockey) players
Ice hockey players from Massachusetts
Living people
Portland Pirates players
Philadelphia Phantoms players
RPI Engineers men's ice hockey players
Toronto Maple Leafs draft picks
Trenton Titans players
Wilkes-Barre/Scranton Penguins players
American men's ice hockey left wingers